The Stockholm International Peace Research Institute, SIPRI, Arms Transfers Database contains information on all international transfers of major weapons (including sales, gifts and production under licence) to states, international organizations and armed non-state groups since 1950. It is the only publicly available resource providing consistent data on arms transfers for this length of time. The database can be used to track transfers of major weapons and to answer such questions as:

 Who are the main suppliers and recipients of major weapons?
 How have relations between different suppliers and recipients changed over time?
 Where do countries in conflict get their weapons?
 How do states implement their export control regulations?
 Where are potentially destabilizing build-ups of weapons occurring today?
 What major weapons have been exported or imported?

Imports of conventional arms by Iraq 1973–1990, by source
Values are shown in millions of US dollars at constant (1990) estimated values. "Soviet Union and Warsaw Pact" includes Czechoslovakia, East Germany, Hungary, Poland, and Romania. The majority of these transfers came from the Soviet Union, followed by Czechoslovakia.

The Stockholm International Peace Research Institute (SIPRI) makes the following comment of the methodology of this table:

The SIPRI data on arms transfers refer to actual deliveries of major conventional weapons. To permit comparison between the data on such deliveries of different weapons and identification of general trends, SIPRI uses a trend-indicator value. The SIPRI values are therefore only an indicator of the volume of international arms transfers and not of the actual financial values of such transfers.

SIPRI's data are founded entirely on open sources:

The type of open information used by SIPRI cannot provide a comprehensive picture of world arms transfers. Published reports often provide only partial information, and substantial disagreement among reports is common. Order and delivery dates, exact numbers, types of weapon and the identity of suppliers or recipients may not always be clear.

Arms suppliers to Iraq
The table shows the majority of conventional arms imported by Iraq during the 1970s, when the regime was building up the armies which were to attack Iran in 1980, were supplied by the Soviet Union and its satellites, principally Czechoslovakia. The only substantial Western arms supplier to Iraq was France, which continued to be a major supplier until 1990, when Iraq invaded Kuwait and all legal arms transfers to Iraq ended.

The United States did not supply any arms to Iraq until 1982, when Iran's growing military success alarmed American policymakers. It then did so every year until 1988. These sales amounted to less than 1% of the total arms sold to Iraq in the relevant period. Although most other countries never hesitated to sell military hardware directly to Saddam Hussein's regime, the U.S., equally keen to protect its interests in the region, opted for and developed an indirect approach. The CIA began covertly directing non-U.S. origin hardware to Hussein's armed forces, "to ensure that Iraq had sufficient military weapons, ammunition and vehicles to avoid losing the Iran-Iraq war." The full extent of these transfers is not yet known, and details do not appear in the SIPRI Arms Transfers Database, which relies entirely on open sources.

In 1996, the Scott Report in the United Kingdom investigated arms sales to Iraq in the 1980s by Matrix Churchill in what became known as the Arms-to-Iraq scandal.

Table of major conventional arms sales to Iraq by country

Political implications
The Soviet Union and her satellites were the main suppliers of arms to Iraq following the 1972 signing of the Soviet-Iraqi Treaty of Friendship and Cooperation. France was another important supplier of weapons to Iraq during the 1970s. The United States, the world's leading arms exporter, did not have normal relations with Iraq from 1967 (due to the Six-Day War) until 1984.

Soviet-Iraqi relations suffered strains in the late 1970s. When Iraq invaded Iran in 1980, the Soviet Union cut off weapons sales to Iraq and did not resume them until 1982. During the war, the People's Republic of China became a major new source of weapons for Iraq, with increasing sales from France, the U.K. and Egypt.

See also
 International aid to combatants in the Iran–Iraq War
 United States support for Iran during the Iran–Iraq war
 Arms trade
 Arms Industry
 Stockholm International Peace Research Institute

References

External links
 online.
 SIPRI Arms Transfers Database 
 Arms transfers to Iraq, 1970-2004 (via archive.org)

Military history of Iraq
Weapons trade